This is a list of the National Register of Historic Places listings in Elliott County, Kentucky.

This is intended to be a detailed table of the property on the National Register of Historic Places in Elliott County, Kentucky, United States. The locations of National Register properties for which the latitude and longitude coordinates are included below, may be seen in a map.

There is 1 property listed on the National Register in the county.

Current listing

|}

See also
List of National Historic Landmarks in Kentucky
National Register of Historic Places listings in Kentucky

References

Elliott